Zadawa is a town in Bauchi State, Nigeria.

Geography
Zadawa is located 120 km east of Dutse, 30 km southeast of Azare, 35 km south of Madara, and 40 km east of Faggo.  The population of Zadawa is 7,772.

References

Populated places in Bauchi State